The Talfer is a river located in South Tyrol, Italy. It flows into the Eisack in Bolzano.

References 
Civic Network of South Tyrol (in German)

External links 

Rivers of Italy
Rivers of South Tyrol